Akidnognathus is an extinct genus of therocephalians.

See also

 List of therapsids

References

 The main groups of non-mammalian synapsids at Mikko's Phylogeny Archive

Akidnognathids
Fossil taxa described in 1918
Taxa named by Sidney H. Haughton
Therocephalia genera